Robert Heffernan (born 28 February 1978) is an Irish race walker.

Career
At the 2000 Olympics he finished in 28th place in the 20 km walk, and at the 2004 Olympics he was disqualified.

At the 2008 Olympic Games he improved, coming eighth in the 20 km walk. His wife Marian Andrews is also national women's 400 metres champion and was on the Irish women's team that finished 4th in the European indoors. On 27 July 2010, Heffernan won the bronze medal in the 2010 European Athletics Championships in the 20 kilometres walk, posting a time of 1:21:00 (achieved retrospectively in 2014 after Russian Stanislav Emelyanov was found to have committed an anti-doping violation). He also finished 4th in the 50km walk in a national record time of 3:45:30, a notable achievement just three days after the 20 km event.

At the 2012 Olympics, Heffernan finished ninth in the 20km race. A week later he finished fourth in the 50km, finishing seven minutes faster than the previous national record. His achievements in London were the top two performances for the Irish Athletics team at the 2012 Olympics.

In early 2015, it was revealed that a number of Russian male and female champion racewalkers were under investigation for doping violations including the winner of the 50 km walk in London, Sergey Kirdyapkin. The athlete was retrospectively suspended during specific periods between 2009 and 2012 by his federation (RUSADA) and had most of his results annulled —including world titles, but not his Olympic title.

The IAAF were unhappy with the verdict made by the Russian Athletics federation and made it clear that they would be taking the case to the Court of Arbitration for Sport (CAS) believing that the ban should include his participation in the London Olympics. In a statement, the IAAF disagreed with the selective disqualification of results applied by RUSADA.

On 24 March 2016, the court of Arbitration for Sport favoured the IAAF and Heffernan was upgraded to Olympic Bronze.	He received his bronze medal in November 2016.

2013 World championships

On 14 August 2013, Heffernan finished first in the 2013 World Championships in Athletics 50km event in Moscow, finishing over a minute clear of the silver medal position with a winning time of 3:37:56.
Speaking after the race Heffernan said "Its surreal, it's just a great feeling," he said. "When I came into the stadium it just felt like an out of body experience. It's hard to take it all in at the moment. I'm delighted."

The winning time was the fastest time in the world in 2013 by more than three minutes.

Other work
In November 2022, Heffernan was announced as performance coach of the Cork senior footballers, working under the management of John Cleary.

Performance at major championships

Personal life 
Heffernan is married to Marian Heffernan, a 400M Olympian, and lives with his wife and family in Cork city. He has written an autobiography of his life called Walking Tall in 2016. His son Cathal Heffernan plays football for AC Milan's under-19 squad and was captain of the Republic of Ireland under-17 national squad.

References

External links

Irish Times Olympic Profile

1978 births
Living people
Athletes (track and field) at the 2000 Summer Olympics
Athletes (track and field) at the 2004 Summer Olympics
Athletes (track and field) at the 2008 Summer Olympics
Athletes (track and field) at the 2012 Summer Olympics
Athletes (track and field) at the 2016 Summer Olympics
Cork county football team
European Athletics Championships medalists
Irish male racewalkers
Medalists at the 2012 Summer Olympics
Olympic athletes of Ireland
Olympic bronze medalists for Ireland
Olympic bronze medalists in athletics (track and field)
Sportspeople from Cork (city)
People educated at Coláiste Chríost Rí
World Athletics Championships athletes for Ireland
World Athletics Championships medalists
World Athletics Championships winners